Heaven Before All Hell Breaks Loose is the third studio album by English singer and rapper Plan B. It was released on 4 May 2018 by Atlantic Records and 679 Artists.

Background
In 2010, Plan B released his second studio album The Defamation of Strickland Banks, a concept album about "the journey of a fictional soul singer who was imprisoned for a crime he didn't commit". The following year, he announced a follow-up album, The Ballad of Belmarsh. He told the Daily Mirror that the album would be closer in tone to his debut, Who Needs Actions When You Got Words: "It's an underground hip-hop album about Strickland Banks being banged up in Belmarsh. I won't be him singing anymore, I'll be rapping about him, commenting on the story." In September 2011, Plan B announced that The Ballad of Belmarsh had been put on hold in order to work on his then-upcoming film Ill Manors (2012).

In April 2018, Plan B stated that the project never came to fruition because he got bored of the Strickland Banks character:

"It's one of those lost albums. I'd shot Ill Manors and the label wasn't taking the film seriously. I'd written most of it before I put out ...Strickland Banks. I was living at RAK Studios and done the whole American thing where I've got different people working in different rooms. It was bollocks. It felt like I was only doing it to capitalise on the success of Strickland Banks and at that point I was sick of Strickland Banks. Fuck him.

"You know them fuckers who get stuck in sitcoms, like the geezer from Steptoe & Son? Apparently he was a sick up 'n' coming actor and he done Steptoe & Son and it blew up and he got typecast. I started to experience what that felt like by doing The Ballad of Belmarsh after Strickland Banks. By that point, I hated the sight of Strickland Banks. I'm sure a lot of other people did too. I was plastered everywhere. That would've got on my nerves. It did get on my nerves!"

"I can understand why it gets on other people's nerves, when someone gets so big you're just bombarded with their face all over the place. I was sick of the sight of my own face. That's why I did Ill Manors instead of The Ballad of Belmarsh."

Track listing
Adapted from iTunes.

Charts

References

2018 albums
679 Artists albums
Atlantic Records albums
Plan B (musician) albums